Horka may refer to:

Places

 Horka (Chrudim District), a village in the Pardubice Region, Czech Republic
 Horka I, a village in Kutná Hora District, Czech Republic
 Horka II, a village in Kutná Hora District, Czech Republic
 Horka, Saxony (Sorbian: Hórka), a municipality in Saxony, Germany
 Hôrka, a village in the Poprad District of Slovakia

Other uses
 Horka (title) or harka, a political or military title used by Magyar tribes during the 9th century

See also